The Sabancı family is one of the wealthiest families in Turkey according to the Forbes billionaires list of 2016, with an estimated fortune ranging between $20–30 billion. The family's main business entity was founded by Hacı Ömer Sabancı in the 1930s. Hacı Ömer Sabancı, the progenitor of the Sabancı family, moved from his native Kayseri to Adana in the early 1920s. Some second and third generation members of the family today control a group of companies under Sabancı Holding. Most of the companies were established by the efforts of the second generation members of the family, Sakıp Sabancı, Hacı Sabancı, Şevket Sabancı, Erol Sabancı, and Özdemir Sabancı . After the death of Sakıp Sabancı, also known as Sakip Aga, in 2004, the granddaughter of the founder, Güler Sabancı, was chosen to run Sabancı Holding.

Today, some second and third generation members of the family have left their managerial positions at the Sabanci Group and established their own companies such as Densa, Demsa and Esas Holding which owns Pegasus Airlines.

See also
 Sakıp Sabancı Museum
 Sabancı University

References

 
Turkish families
Sabanci
Sabanci
Turkish business families